The Seaward 32RK is an American sailboat that was designed by Nick Hake as a cruiser and first built in 2006.

The design is also sometimes called the Hake 32RK.

Production
The design was built by Hake Yachts in the United States, starting in 2006, but it is now out of production.

Design
The Seaward 32RK is a recreational keelboat, built predominantly of fiberglass, with wood trim. It has a masthead sloop rig, with a bowsprit; a plumb stem; a vertical, walk-through transom; a lifting, transom-hung rudder controlled by a wheel and a lifting keel with a weighted bulb, actuated by an electric winch. It displaces  and carries  of ballast. 

The walk-through transom has a swimming ladder and a hot and cold shower.

The boat is fitted with a Japanese Yanmar 3YM30  diesel engine for docking and maneuvering.

The design has sleeping accommodation for six people, with a double "V"-berth in the bow cabin, a "U"-shaped dinette table that forms a double berth and an aft cabin with a double berth on the port side. The galley is located on the starboard side just forward of the companionway ladder. The galley is "L"-shaped and is equipped with a two-burner stove and a double sink. A navigation station is opposite the galley, on the starboard side. The head is located just aft of the bow cabin on the port side.

Operational history
In a 2020 review in Blue Water Sailing, Sandy Parks wrote, " The 32RK has one signature design feature that makes it uniquely suitable for cruising in areas with a lot of shallow water and for sailors who want to trailer their boats. The RK in its name stands for 'retracting keel' which enables you to lower the keel to whatever depth you want, within reason, and to raise it again when the water starts to get thin. A simple electric winch raises and lowers the keel."

See also
List of sailing boat types

References

External links
Official website archives on archive.org

Keelboats
2000s sailboat type designs
Trailer sailers
Sailboat type designs by Nick Hake
Sailboat types built by Hake Yachts